Cecilia Grierson is a station on the Buenos Aires Premetro. It was opened on 29 April 1987 together with the other Premetro stations. The station is located in the Barrio of Villa Soldati, near Parque de la Ciudad. It will provide access to the Predio Ferial Olímpico and the Youth Olympic Village (YOV) for the 2018 Summer Youth Olympics.

References

Buenos Aires PreMetro stations
Buenos Aires Underground stations
Railway stations opened in 1987